The Chin Hills wren-babbler (Spelaeornis oatesi) is a bird species in the family Timaliidae. It was until recently considered a subspecies of the long-tailed wren-babbler; the IUCN for example started recognizing it as distinct species in 2008.

It is found in India and Myanmar. Its natural habitat are subtropical or tropical moist montane forests. It is therefore classified as a Species of Least Concern by the IUCN.

Footnotes

References
 BirdLife International (BLI) (2008): 2008 IUCN Redlist status changes. Retrieved 2008-MAY-23.

Chin Hills wren-babbler
Birds of Myanmar
Endemic fauna of Myanmar
Chin Hills wren-babbler